Phyllantheae is a tribe of the family Phyllanthaceae. The taxonomy of the group is not yet clear, and work continues (see Phyllanthus for more details). A recent revision based on nuclear and chloroplast DNA sequences divides the tribe into 6 subtribes and 18 genera.

References

Phyllanthaceae
Malpighiales tribes